is a Japanese voice actress, originally affiliated with Aoni Production and becomes a freelancer in April 2017. Her major anime roles include: Asuna Kagurazaka in the Negima series, Kana Suouin in Otome wa Boku ni Koishiteru, Kazuki Arisaka in Tona-Gura!, Rihoko Amaha in Witchblade, Ryou Fujibayashi in Clannad, Tokino Akiyama in Kujibiki Unbalance, and Nina Sakura in Ultra Maniac. She also sings with the voice actors on songs for the anime shows and is associated with voice actor units Drops and Aice5, releasing multiple character and compilation albums. In video games she voices Estelle Bright in The Legend of Heroes: Trails in the Sky, Nanako Dojima in Persona 4, Mio Amakura in Fatal Frame II: Crimson Butterfly, and Melody in Rune Factory.

Filmography

Anime

Overseas dubbing

Video games

Discography

Albums
 Studio and mini-albums
  (Konami, 2002)
  (Starchild, 2006)
  (Starchild, 2006)
  (Starchild, 2006)
  (Starchild, 2006)
  (Starchild, 2006)

 with Aice5
 Love Aice5 (Starchild, 2007)

 with DROPS
 Can Drops (Starchild, 2004)

 Compilation albums
 Bitter Sweet Friday (King Records, KIZC-7~8, 2007)

Drama CDs

References

External links
  at Aoni Production 
  at Starchild 
 
 

1978 births
Living people
Voice actresses from Nagoya
Japanese video game actresses
Japanese voice actresses
Aoni Production voice actors
21st-century Japanese actresses